Special member functions in C++ are functions which the compiler will automatically generate if they are used, but not declared explicitly by the programmer.
The automatically generated special member functions are:
 Default constructor if no other constructor is explicitly declared.
 Copy constructor if no move constructor and move assignment operator are explicitly declared. 
 If a destructor is declared generation of a copy constructor is deprecated (C++11, proposal N3242).
 Move constructor if no copy constructor, copy assignment operator, move assignment operator and destructor are explicitly declared. 
 Copy assignment operator if no move constructor and move assignment operator are explicitly declared. 
 If a destructor is declared, generation of a copy assignment operator is deprecated. 
 Move assignment operator if no copy constructor, copy assignment operator, move constructor and destructor are explicitly declared. 
 Destructor
 The 'address of' operator (unary '&' operator)

In these cases the compiler generated versions of these functions perform a memberwise operation. For example, the compiler generated destructor will destroy each sub-object (base class or member) of the object.

The compiler generated functions will be public, non-virtual and the copy constructor and assignment operators will receive const& parameters (and not be of the alternative legal forms).

Example

#include <iostream>
#include <string>
#include <utility>

class Explicit {
 public:
  Explicit() { std::cout << "Default constructor " << message_ << '\n'; }

  explicit Explicit(std::string message) : message_(std::move(message)) {
    std::cout << "Non-default constructor " << message_ << '\n';
  }

  Explicit(const Explicit& other) {
    std::cout << "Copy constructor " << message_ << '\n';
    *this = other;  // invoke copy assignment operator
  }

  Explicit& operator=(const Explicit& other) {
    std::cout << "Copy assignment operator " << message_ << '\n';
    if (this != &other) {
      message_ = other.message_;
    }
    return *this;
  }

  Explicit(Explicit&& other) noexcept {
    std::cout << "Move constructor " << message_ << '\n';
    *this = std::move(other);  // invoke move assignment operator
  }

  Explicit& operator=(Explicit&& other) noexcept {
    std::cout << "Move assignment operator " << message_ << '\n';
    if (this != &other) {
      message_ = std::move(other.message_);
    }
    return *this;
  }

  ~Explicit() { std::cout << "Destructor " << message_ << '\n'; }

 private:
  friend class Implicit;
  std::string message_;
};

class Implicit : public Explicit {
 public:
  void Spew() {
    std::cout << "Implicit(" << message_ << ", " << member_.message_ << ")\n";
  }

 private:
  Explicit member_;
};

Signatures
Here are the signatures of the special member functions:

C++03
In C++03 before the introduction of move semantics (in C++11) the special member functions were:
 Default constructor (if no other constructor is explicitly declared)
 Copy constructor
 Copy assignment operator
 Destructor
 The 'address of' operator (unary '&' operator)

References

C++
Articles with example C++ code